The Empire Award for Best British Director was an Empire Award presented annually by the British film magazine Empire to honor a British director working within the film industry. The Empire Award for Best British Director was first introduced at the 2nd Empire Awards ceremony in 1997 with Danny Boyle receiving the award for his direction of Trainspotting and last presented as an annual award at the 6th Empire Awards ceremony in 2001 with it returning for a final time at the 10th Empire Awards ceremony in 2005. It was one of three Best British awards retired that year (the others being Best British Actor and Best British Actress). Winners were voted by the readers of Empire magazine.

Since its inception, the award has been given to six directors. Guy Ritchie, Roger Michell and Shane Meadows were nominated on two occasions each, more than any other director. Matthew Vaughn was the last winner in this category for his role in Layer Cake.

Winners and nominees
In the list below, winners are listed first in bold, followed by the other nominees. The number of the ceremony (1st, 2nd, etc.) appears in parentheses after the awards year, linked to the article (if any) on that ceremony.

1990s

2000s

Multiple awards and nominations
No individual received more than one Best British Director award.

Multiple nominations
The following individuals received two or more Best British Director nominations:

References

External links

Director
Awards for best director